Pharoah is an album by the saxophonist Pharoah Sanders, recorded in 1976 and released on the India Navigation label.

Reception

In a review for AllMusic, John Bush acknowledged that "the playing is excellent," but stated that Sanders was "beginning to drift into watery new age muzak." He concluded: "Clearly, Pharoah Sanders was losing his way a full ten years after the death of John Coltrane."

A writer for The Jazz Spot called the album "one of the most underrated records of the artist's career," and noted that the three tracks "denote an enormous originality and honesty." He commented: "Its diversity is complemented with a regular and uniform quality throughout the recording."

Track listing
All compositions by Pharoah Sanders
 "Harvest Time" - 20:15		
 "Love Will Find a Way" - 14:31
 "Memories of Edith Johnson" - 5:40

Personnel
Pharoah Sanders - tenor saxophone, percussion, vocals
Bedria Sanders - harmonium (track 1) 
Clifton "Jiggs" Chase - organ (tracks 2 & 3)
 Tisziji Munoz - guitar 
Steve Neil- bass 
Greg Bandy - drums (tracks 2 & 3)
Lawrence Killian - percussion

References

1977 albums
Pharoah Sanders albums
India Navigation albums